Varsity Pictures is an American film and television production company founded in 2007 by Sharla Sumpter Bridgett and Brian Robbins. It produced Sonny with a Chance, So Random!, Blue Mountain State, Supah Ninjas, and Fred: The Show. It also produced Fred: The Movie, Playing with Guns, Fred 2: Night of the Living Fred, and A Thousand Words.

Filmography

Television

Film

References

External links
 Varsity Pictures Twitter page
 Varsity Pictures Facebook page
 Varsity Pictures at the Internet Movie Database

Film production companies of the United States
Television production companies of the United States
American companies established in 2007